Windyville is an unincorporated community located in Edmonson County, Kentucky, United States.

History 
The name of Windyville is derived from its old nickname, “Kentucky’s Windy City”. Much so, a restaurant housed within a convenience store in the community was called “Windy City Cafe.” The store was shut down at some point in 2003 due to new competition in the Riverhill neighborhood on Brownsville's northern outskirts.

Geography and location

Education 
Students who are residing in Windyville attend Edmonson County Schools, including the Edmonson County High School, in Brownsville. At one time, Windyville was served by locally based school just west of the town, Blanton School, as well as another school in nearby Asphalt until the 1959-60 merger of all of Edmonson County's high schools in other communities. The Asphalt School building is still standing, but not in the condition to be used.

Transportation
In terms of transportation, Windyville is served by State Highway 70, connecting to Brownsville (the Edmonson County seat), Roundhill, and the Butler County seat of Morgantown. It was previously also served by the original KY 67 (now part of KY 655), which connected Windyville to Bowling Green by way of the now-out-of-service Bear Creek Ferry on the Green River.

References

Unincorporated communities in Edmonson County, Kentucky
Unincorporated communities in Kentucky